Martin Clark (born 27 October 1968) is an English organiser of snooker tournaments and retired professional snooker player.

Career
Clark reached ten ranking tournament quarter-finals in his career, but never progressed any further. He reached the last 16 of the World Championship three times – 1991, 1992 and 1993, and also in 1992 reached the first major semi-final of his career at the World Matchplay by knocking out defending champion Gary Wilkinson. He won two non-ranking events, defeating Ray Reardon in the final of the European Grand Masters in 1990 and Andy Hicks in the Pontins Professional in 1997.

He retired as a pro player at a relatively young age, due to neck problems, and is now a tournament director. He has also helped with equipment maintenance (e.g. checking the replacement cloths) at the World Snooker Championship.

In November 2017, Belgian player Luca Brecel was forced to borrow clothes from Clark and fellow player Michael White after lifting the wrong suitcase at an airport in Shanghai.

Performance and rankings timeline

Career finals

Non-ranking finals: 4 (2 titles)

Pro-am finals: 1 (1 title)

References

1968 births
Living people
English snooker players
Snooker referees and officials
People from Sedgley
Sportspeople from the West Midlands (county)
English referees and umpires